This is a list of flag bearers who have represented Kosovo at the Olympics.

Flag bearers carry the national flag of their country at the opening ceremony of the Olympic Games.

See also
Kosovo at the Olympics

References

Kosovo at the Olympics
Kosovo
Olympic flagbearers
Olympics